NGC 992 is a spiral galaxy in the Aries constellation and is estimated to be 188 million light years from the Milky Way. NGC 992 was discovered by astronomers Lewis A. Swift on September 6, 1886.

See also 
 List of NGC objects (1–1000)

References

External links 
 

Spiral galaxies
0992
Aries (constellation)
009938